Queen Seongpyeong of the Jangheung Im clan (d. 1247) was a Goryeo royal family member and queen consort through her marriage with King Huijong as his second wife and followed her maternal clans as a result.

She was born into the Royal House of Wang as the daughter of Wang Jin, Marquess Yeongin (왕진 영인후) and Princess Yeonhui (연희궁주) who was the daughter of King Myeongjong, making her became both of first cousin once removed (maternal) and fifth cousin (paternal) to her future husband. In 1211 (7th year reign of her husband), she was given the Royal title Princess Hampyeong (함평궁주, 咸平宮主) and formally became the queen consort. Together, they had 5 sons and 5 daughters. When her husband tried to shoot Choe Chung-heon (최충헌) at Suchang Palace (수창공), he was failed and forced to abdicated the throne as the result. Then, Huijong and their eldest son exiled to the nowadays of Incheon and she became the only left in the main palace, which believed that it was due to her close relatively with the next Kings, Gangjong and Gojong.

Upon the Goryeo-Mongol war broke out, the court moved the Palace and she later died without being able to leave Ganghwa-gyeong (강화경, 江華京) on 1247 (34th year reign of Gojong of Goryeo). The queen was later buried in Soreung tomb (소릉, 紹陵) and received Jeongjang (정장, 貞章) as her Posthumous name given by King Gojong in 1253.

In popular culture
Portrayed by Chae Min-seo in the 2003–04 KBS1 TV Series Age of Warriors.

References

External links
Queen Seongpyeong on Encykorea .
Queen Seongpyeong on Goryeosa .

Royal consorts of the Goryeo Dynasty
Korean queens consort
Year of birth unknown
1247 deaths